Semon's green tree skink (Prasinohaema semoni)  is a species of skink found in New Guinea.

References

Prasinohaema
Reptiles described in 1894
Taxa named by Anthonie Cornelis Oudemans